Puerto Rico Highway 810 (PR-810) is a north–south road located entirely in the municipality of Naranjito, Puerto Rico.

Major intersections

See also

 List of highways numbered 810

References

External links
 

810
Naranjito, Puerto Rico